Yves Dassonville (9 April 1948 – 15 June 2021) was a French civil servant and statistician. He served as the High Commissioner of New Caledonia from 25 October 2007, succeeding Michel Mathieu, who resigned following a disagreement with then Minister of Overseas France Christian Estrosi over general strikes and social problems in the territory, until 2010.

Dassonville was awarded the French National Order of Merit.

Dassonville died on 15 June 2021 at the age of 73.

References

1948 births
2021 deaths
High Commissioners of New Caledonia
French civil servants
French statisticians
Scientists from Paris
Politicians from Paris
Officers of the Ordre national du Mérite
Officiers of the Légion d'honneur
Prefects of Jura
Prefects of Vienne
Prefects of Haute-Vienne
Prefects of Martinique